For the Welsh rugby union prop forward see Dai Young

Dave Young (born 18 February 1985 in Belfast, Northern Ireland) is a Scotland 'A' international rugby union prop. He plays for Jersey. He previously played for the Leicester Tigers, Gloucester, Edinburgh, Lazio, Leeds Carnegie and Jersey.

Young joined Newport Gwent Dragons for the 2014–15 season.

References

External links
Leicester Tigers profile
Gloucester profile
Statbunker profile

1985 births
Living people
Rugby union players from Belfast
Irish rugby union players
Leicester Tigers players
Gloucester Rugby players
Dragons RFC players
Sportspeople from Gloucestershire
Glenrothes RFC players
Scotland 'A' international rugby union players
Edinburgh Rugby players
Leeds Tykes players
Jersey Reds players
London Scottish F.C. players
Rugby union props